Yuvan may refer to:

 Yuvan, Iran, a village in Miyan Darband Rural District, Kermanshah Province, Iran
 Yuvan (actor), Indian film actor
 Yuvan Shankar Raja, Indian film score and soundtrack composer and singer-songwriter
 Keratam, a 2011 Indian Telugu film , simultaneously made in Tamil as Yuvan